Polypedates teraiensis, also known as perching frog, six-lined tree frog, or Terai tree frog is a species of frog in the family Rhacophoridae.
It is found in eastern Nepal; eastern, peninsular, and north-eastern India (West Bengal, Meghalaya, Assam, Arunachal Pradesh, Nagaland, Manipur, Sikkim, also reported for Gujarat and Madhya Pradesh) and Bangladesh, into adjacent Myanmar, and possibly into adjacent China.

In northeastern India, Polypedates teraiensis begins breeding after the first few rains of the rainy season (approximately March) and produces foam nests normally attached to vegetation above shallow temporary still water but can also be found on logs or walls of human habitation. Embryos hatch at stage 20, but stay within the nest until dropping from the nest into the water at stage 22. Full development of larvae from ovum fertilization to the emergence of froglet lasts 58 days.

References

teraiensis
Amphibians described in 1987
Taxonomy articles created by Polbot
Taxobox binomials not recognized by IUCN